Side Street Angel is a 1937 British crime comedy film directed by Ralph Ince and starring Hugh Williams, Lesley Brook and Henry Kendall.  The film is now considered lost.

Premise
A rich man poses as a poor man and is taken by a convict into a hostel and given a job by the chief assistant.

Cast
 Hugh Williams as Peter
 Lesley Brook as Anne
 Henry Kendall as Boscomb
 Reginald Purdell as McGill
 Phyllis Stanley as Laura
  Madeline Seymour as Mrs. Kane
 Edna Davies as Loretta

References

External links

 Synopsis  at Allmovie.com

1937 films
1930s English-language films
Films directed by Ralph Ince
British crime comedy films
1930s crime comedy films
British black-and-white films
Lost British films
Warner Bros. films
1937 comedy films
1937 lost films
1930s British films